Baldur's Gate II: Enhanced Edition is a remaster of the role-playing video game Baldur's Gate II: Shadows of Amn and its expansion Baldur's Gate II: Throne of Bhaal. The game was launched on Microsoft Windows and Mac OS X. Baldur's Gate II: Enhanced Edition features new content and widescreen compatibility.

The remaster was developed by Overhaul Games, a division of Beamdog and was published by Atari. The release includes remastered versions of the original Baldur's Gate II: Shadows of Amn and its expansions under an enhanced version of the Infinity Engine, known as the Infinity Enhanced Engine. Overhaul Games initially planned to release it in 2013, after the release of Baldur's Gate: Enhanced Edition, but due to contractual issues with Atari, Beamdog announced that the Enhanced would not be launched. On August 15, 2013 Beamdog CEO Trent Oster announced that the contractual issues have been resolved and that news regarding Baldur's Gate II: Enhanced Edition was forthcoming. This edition was released on November 15, 2013 on PC. It was released on the App Store on January 16, 2014.

Gameplay 
For all editions, the game follows 2nd Edition Advanced Dungeons & Dragons, licensed by Wizards of the Coast. The game features much of the same updated gameplay presented in Baldur's Gate: Enhanced Edition, with the same updated (including cross platform) multiplayer, which allows players from different platforms to play with each other. Major changes to this game's presentation include its higher resolution and widescreen viewing modes to enhance gameplay.

The iPad and Android versions present a radical departure from the original interface, with the multitouch screen allowing for gestures that can result in zooming in and out. This is to allow for larger text and more focus on enhanced detail. Tablet versions also allow for users to swipe between screens, eliminating the use for tabs.  Ex-Bioware employee and creative director for the enhanced edition Trent Oster said, "When I describe playing a Baldur's Gate combat scenario to someone, I use the analogy of a football playbook. ... When you think about Baldur's Gate in this light, the iPad makes so much sense. In fact, I think Baldur's Gate is almost the perfect game for the touch interface—it was just released a decade early."

Plot

Setting 
Set in the Forgotten Realms continent of Faerûn, Baldur's Gate II: Enhanced Edition takes place in the nations of Amn and Tethyr. As with the original Enhanced Edition, all locations from the original production are present as well as new locations. Depending on the characters recruited, up to thirty new locations can be accessed.

Characters 
While the original characters of Baldur's Gate II return once again, the Enhanced Edition brings back the new characters introduced in Baldur's Gate: Enhanced Edition - Neera the Wild Mage, Dorn Il-Khan the Blackguard, and Rasaad the Monk - who are once again recruitable, with two additional new characters, unique to Baldur's Gate II: Enhanced Edition - Hexxat the Thief, and Wilson the Bear. Each, like before, have a personal character quest that sees the player travelling to new locations, both in Shadows of Amn and Throne of Bhaal; the latter involves the characters bringing a close to their personal stories. Much like the previous game, all of new characters from Baldur's Gate: Enhanced Edition are once again available as romance options.

Story 
The general plot of the game remains relatively unchanged, aside from the sidequests added in due to new characters. The largest new plot feature comes in the form of The Black Pits 2: Gladiators of Thay, an optional and standalone story which acts as a sequel to a challenge mode present in the previous Enhanced Edition. The mode pits players in gladitorial combat against such creatures as Mind Flayers, Githyanki and Demi-Liches.

Development 
Beamdog had negotiated to get a contract for the first two Baldur's Gate games from Atari and Wizards of the Coast for approximately fourteen months before they were allowed to start working on the Enhanced Editions. Beamdog also needed to get a license to use the Infinity Engine from BioWare. Upon development, the decision was made to make the game available on the iPad—it will be compatible with all three generations of iPad. On March 15, 2012, remasters of both Baldur's Gate and Baldur's Gate II were announced. Baldur's Gate II: Enhanced Edition was slated for a 2013 release for both the PC and iPad. Nat Jones was named the official art director for the remasters, with senior Dungeons & Dragons writer Dave Gross also joining the team. Sam Hulick composed new music for the game.

Via his Twitter account, developer Trent Oster revealed that the studio would not be making an Xbox 360 version for either remaster, because the controller was not a good fit for the Infinity Engine. He added that his team would not be porting the game to Wii U due to their negative experience with Nintendo while developing MDK2 HD. It was later revealed that Sony had contacted Beamdog about making both remasters available on the PlayStation 3, though nothing would come out of it. Sony and Beamdog were unable to negotiate a price required for funding the redesign of the game, difficult due to differences in controls and the UI between the PC and PlayStation 3.

On June 19, 2013, Baldur's Gate II: Enhanced Edition's development was put on hold indefinitely due to legal issues with Atari. Developer Trent Oster described the Overhaul team as being "demoralized" due to the incident. Upon the resolution of the contractual and legal issues on August 15, 2013, Overhaul Games promised details regarding the remaster following the release of the patch for Baldur's Gate: Enhanced Edition. It was later confirmed that it would be "a while" before news about the remaster would be released, though. At the end of the month, the release date was announced and a gameplay trailer was shown, with confirmation of an iOS edition later on.

Skybound Games, a division of Skybound Entertainment, released the remastered version to Nintendo Switch, PlayStation 4 and Xbox One on October 15, 2019.

Reception 

The game received positive review scores from most of the critics. On Metacritic, it holds an aggregate score of 78/100 for the Windows version while the iOS version holds an aggregate score of 70/100. Ryan Cartmel of the online magazine Hardcore Gamer gave the game a 4.5/5, saying "with an epic story, memorable characters, hundreds of hours of dungeon crawling, questing and adventuring, Baldur's Gate stands tall among the classics. The Enhanced Edition takes all that (and then some) and wraps it in a much more visually pleasing package that will be more acceptable to modern gamers" Patrick Hancock of Destructoid gave the release a score of 8.5/10 calling the remaster and the additions "impressive efforts with a few noticeable problems holding it back". Brett Todd of GameSpot gave the revision a review score of 7/10 praising the new additions to the game. Leif Johnson of IGN gave the game a review score of 8.3/10 praising it for the improved visuals and new additions.

References

External links
 

2013 video games
Android (operating system) games
Baldur's Gate video games
Infinity Engine games
IOS games
Linux games
MacOS games
Multiplayer and single-player video games
Nintendo Switch games
PlayStation 4 games
Role-playing video games
Video game remakes
Video games developed in Canada
Video games featuring protagonists of selectable gender
Windows games
Xbox One games